Soulmates is an album by saxophonist Ben Webster and pianist Joe Zawinul featuring tracks recorded in 1963 for the Riverside label.

Reception

Allmusic awarded the album 4 stars with its review by Jim Todd stating "What initially seems like an unlikely pairing for this session delivers on its unique pedigree with performances that do full justice to tenor legend Ben Webster and to the then up and coming pianist Joe Zawinul".

Track listing

 "Too Late Now" (Burton Lane, Alan Jay Lerner) - 6:26     
 "Soulmates" (Ben Webster) - 6:32     
 "Come Sunday" (Duke Ellington) - 5:10     
 "The Governor" (Ben Webster) - 3:13     
 "Frog Legs" (Joe Zawinul) - 5:29     
 "Trav'lin' Light" (Johnny Mercer, Jimmy Mundy, Trummy Young) - 6:08     
 "Like Someone in Love" (Johnny Burke, Jimmy Van Heusen) - 3:45     
 "Evol Deklaw Ni" (Thad Jones) - 5:20  
Recorded in New York City on September 20 (tracks 1, 3, 6 & 7) and October 14 (tracks 2, 4, 5 & 8), 1963

Personnel 
Ben Webster - tenor saxophone
Joe Zawinul - piano
Thad Jones - cornet (tracks 2, 4, 5 & 8)
Richard Davis (tracks 1, 3, 6 & 7), Sam Jones (tracks 2, 4, 5 & 8) - bass
Philly Joe Jones - drums

References 

1963 albums
Ben Webster albums
Joe Zawinul albums
Riverside Records albums